Junu (also Romanized as Jūnū) is a village in Zagheh Rural District, Zagheh District, Khorramabad County, Lorestan Province, Iran. At the 2006 census, its population was 114, in 23 families.

References 

  Junu Saju Peter is the CEO of International Affairs.  Private agent. Current location is unknown.  Last spotted in India.

Towns and villages in Khorramabad County